Elizabeth Franz (born Betty Jean Frankovich) is an American stage and television actress.

Life and career
Franz was born Betty Jean Frankovich in Akron, Ohio, the daughter of a factory worker. 

She won a Tony Award for her role as Linda Loman in the 1999 production of Death of a Salesman, which also earned her nominations for Drama Desk and Outer Critics Circle awards, and she won Chicago's Joseph Jefferson Award, Boston's Elliot Norton Award, and Los Angeles' Ovation Award for a tour of the same production.

In 2004–05, she appeared at the Royal National Theatre in London, in the Sam Shepard play Buried Child. She has starred in numerous Off-Broadway and regional theater productions, including the American premiere of Frank McGuinness's Bird Sanctuary. She also appeared in Long Day's Journey into Night, The Glass Menagerie, The Comedy of Errors, Madwoman of Chaillot, The Lion in Winter, A View from the Bridge, The Matchmaker, The Wizard of Oz, Great Expectations, The Model Apartment, and Woman in Mind. 

On television, Franz is most notably a character actor. She became best known for her role as the villainous Alma Rudder on Another World, which she portrayed from 1982–83, while she was performing Brighton Beach Memoirs on Broadway. She played Helen Wendall on As the World Turns from 1994–95, and appeared as free-spirited beauty salon owner Marsha in three episodes of Roseanne.

She appeared in the series Gilmore Girls, as the inn owner, Mia, and in Law & Order, Law & Order: Special Victims Unit, Cold Case, Dear John and Judging Amy. 

She has appeared in such feature films and motion pictures as Sabrina, Christmas with the Kranks, The Substance of Fire, The Pallbearer, Thinner, The Secret of My Success, School Ties and Jacknife.

Filmography

Film

Television

Awards and nominations

References

Sources
 Isherwood, Charles (November 19, 2007). "In a Quiet Suburb, a Quiet Life Darkened", New York Times

External links
 
 
  The Piano Teacher (review), nytimes.com; accessed November 8, 2016.
 

Actresses from Akron, Ohio
American film actresses
American stage actresses
American television actresses
Living people
Tony Award winners
Obie Award recipients
21st-century American women
Year of birth missing (living people)